The Best Director is an award presented annually at the Star Awards, an annual ceremony held in Singapore where the media organisation Mediacorp recognises entertainers under their employment for outstanding performances of the year.

Winners and Nominees

2000s

2010s

2020s

Multiple wins and nominations

The following directors have received two or more Best Director nominations (* indicates no wins):

The following individuals have won multiple Best Director awards:

See also

 List of Asian television awards

References

Star Awards
2014 awards
2017 awards